John S. Kountz (March 25, 1846 – June 14, 1909) was a soldier in the United States Army during the American Civil War.  He received a Medal of Honor.

Biography
Kountz was born March 25, 1846 in Richfield, Ohio.  He attended school in Maumee, Ohio, until the age of fourteen, and in September 1861 enlisted as a drummer boy in the 37th Ohio Infantry. At the Battle of Missionary Ridge, when the drum corps was ordered to the rear, he threw away his drum, seized a musket, and was severely wounded in the first assault, being left in the field under the enemy's guns until he was rescued by his company. This episode was the subject of a poem by Kate B. Sherwood, entitled "The Drummer-Boy of Mission Ridge", which attained a wide reputation. He remained at a hospital in Louisville, Kentucky until he was honorably discharged from the service on April 25, 1864.

On his return to civil life he attended school for one year, after which he was treasurer of Lucas County, Ohio, 1872–1874, and county recorder 1875-1878. He was connected with the Grand Army of the Republic since its organization in 1866, and was elected 13th Commander-in-Chief on July 25, 1884. In the presidential contest that occurred during his official term, he issued an order to bar politics from this organization. He later became president of the Toledo Fire Underwriters' Association.

See also

 List of Medal of Honor recipients
 List of American Civil War Medal of Honor recipients: G–L
 List of Grand Army of the Republic Commanders-in-Chief

References
 
 
Attribution

1846 births
1909 deaths
United States Army Medal of Honor recipients
Union Army soldiers
American Civil War recipients of the Medal of Honor
People of Ohio in the American Civil War
Grand Army of the Republic Commanders-in-Chief
People from Summit County, Ohio
People from Lucas County, Ohio
19th-century American male musicians